Hothfield railway station (later Hothfield Halt) was a railway station on the Maidstone Line at Hothfield, Kent. It was situated between Ashford and  stations. The station opened in 1884; it closed to passengers in 1959 and general freight in 1964 although the sidings continued to be used for deliveries of aggregate traffic.

History
From 1 January 1899, passenger trains ran to and from the former South Eastern Railway's Ashford station. In 1922, weekday passenger services comprised ten down and nine up trains. Four trains ran in each direction on Sundays. The station was listed as "Hothfield for Westwell". From 6 January 1935, eleven trains served the station daily.

On 25 September 1937, the station was reduced to an unstaffed halt. From 2 July 1939, an hourly service was provided. During the Second World War the station buildings were damaged by enemy action. The station closed to passengers on 2 November 1959, and freight on 22 February 1964, as it was deemed uneconomical to improve the station to cater for electrification of the Maidstone line. but the platforms remained and were used by railway staff until the 1980s. The signal box at Hothfield remained in use until 28 April 1984, and then served as a ground frame until 16 February 1985. Freight facilities comprised four sidings on the down side of the station, one of which served a goods shed. A crane of 1 ton 15 cwt (1,800 kg) capacity was provided.

References

Sources

External links
Signal diagram for Hothfield

Railway stations in Great Britain opened in 1884
Railway stations in Great Britain closed in 1959
Disused railway stations in Kent
Former London, Chatham and Dover Railway stations
Transport in the Borough of Ashford
1884 establishments in England
1959 disestablishments in England